The Nygård Bridge is a series of parallel bridges that cross Strømmen, the sound entering Store Lungegårdsvannet, in Bergen, Norway. The Old Nygård Bridge dates from 1854 and carries the two tracks of the Bergen Light Rail as well as pedestrians and cyclists. The New Nygård Bridge opened in 1978, and carries six lanes of European Route E39. The New Nygård Bridge II, built in 2008, carries the two lanes of the street Nygårdsgaten.

The old bridge was opened in 1854 as a pedestrian and vehicle bridge. From 1884 to 1913, it carried the Voss Line of the Norwegian State Railways, and later a line of the Bergen Tramway when Line 1 was extended in 1919, until it was closed down in 1963. In 1938, it was made twice the width. In 2008, the old bridge was rebuilt to carry the Bergen Light Rail, while the street was moved to a new bridge, the New Nygård Bridge II.

References

Road bridges in Bergen
Railway bridges in Vestland
Road-rail bridges
European route E39 in Norway
Bergen Line
Bergen Tramway
Bergen Light Rail
Bridges completed in 1854
Bridges completed in 1978
1854 establishments in Norway